Ørnenosi is a mountain in Vang Municipality in Innlandet county, Norway. The mountain is surrounded by several other notable mountains including Tverrfjellet to the north, Kljåkinnknippene and Skoddetinden to the northwest, Høgeloft to the west, Storebottegge and Rankonosi to the southeast, and Øyre to the northeast.

See also
List of mountains of Norway by height

References

Vang, Innlandet
Mountains of Innlandet